Definitivamente (Definitively), is the title of the third studio album released by Puerto-Rican singer Lourdes Robles in 1991. The album at number ten in the Billboard Latin Pop Albums chart. The album produced three singles: "Sola", "Todo Me Habla de Ti", and "Soñando Contigo". "Sola" peaked at #8 on the Billboard Hot Latin Songs chart, "Todo Me Habla de Ti" peaked at #15 on the Hot Latin Songs chart, and "Soñando Contigo" peaked at #23 on the Hot Latin Songs chart.

Definitivamente was produced by Rudy Pérez and Angel Carrasco and features songs written by both producers, Franco de Vita, Jorge Luis Piloto and Braulio García.

Track listing
The information is taken from the album liner notes.

Chart performance

References

1991 albums
Lourdes Robles albums
Spanish-language albums